Posso Tower is a 16th-century tower house, about  south and west of Peebles, Scottish Borders, Scotland, and west of Manor Water.

History
This was a tower house of the Bairds, which was acquired by the Naesmiths. A new house was built nearby by 1775, by which time the tower was ruined.

Structure
The tower itself stood towards the north west corner of the site. While the west wall rises reaches to a little above second-floor level other walls do not go above a single storey.
Another building, probably not attached to the tower, lay to the south. A more extensive range, with dimensions  by  lay east of the tower; from the centre of its west wall a small wing projected – this may have been a stair tower.
To the south the remains of an enclosure dyke bound the site, in part running above the north bank of the Tower Burn.

See also
Castles in Great Britain and Ireland
List of castles in Scotland

References

Castles in the Scottish Borders